Stevens won the Danny Fullbrook Young Sports Writer of the Year award in 2013.

He has since written articles for the Daily Mirror, Daily Mail, The Daily Telegraph and London Evening Standard.

References

External links
 Samuel Stevens - Journalisted
 "Samuel_Stevens")&displaySearchString=Samuel_Stevens Samuel Stevens - The Independent

1993 births
Living people
Alumni of the University of Hull
English male journalists
English sportswriters
English male non-fiction writers